Shallow reading refers to social practices in which people acquire information or entertainment quickly from texts, images or other meaningful forms, individual or combination, by using various modern media. Shallow reading as a representational form of post-modern mass culture reflects a transition of expense principle tendency from print culture towards visual culture.

Background 
With the continuous update of advanced media technology and popularization of Internet, people are stepping into mobile Internet era shifting. In this process, an obvious change is that traditional reading mode is gradually shifting to shallow reading. The prevalence of shallow reading has attracted attention of media, publishing and library fields.

Features 
1. Superficial

In order to enable people obtain useful information during the process of quick browsing, the target materials of shallow reading are usually very clear and easy to understand as well as with clear-cut topics.

2. Visual

Objectives of shallow reading are often short texts with illustrations and pictures even images and/or video without text captions.

3. Recreational

For deep readers, traditional reading is a process of thinking training and a cultivation of aesthetic culture while shallow reading gets rid of the seriousness of deep reading and mainly aim at facilitating readers acquire information and entertainment in a relaxing and interactive atmosphere.

References 
 Liu, Z. (2005). Reading behavior in the digital environment: Changes in reading behavior over the past ten years. Journal of documentation, 61(6), 700-712. YANG, C., & ZHANG, J. W. (2011). Deep choices in the era of shallow reading. Journal of Academic Library and Information Science, 1, 004. Chaofeng, D. (2011). The Study of Shallow Reading and Deep Reading in the Age of Electronic Media [J]. Library Journal, 3, 003.

Reading (process)